Menkauhor Kaiu (also known as Ikauhor and in Greek as Mencherês, Μεγχερῆς) was an Ancient Egyptian pharaoh of the Old Kingdom period. He was the seventh ruler of the Fifth Dynasty at the end of the 25th century BC or early in the 24th century BC ( circa 2399–2390 BC ).

Menkauhor ruled for possibly eight or nine years, following king Nyuserre Ini, and was succeeded in turn by Djedkare Isesi. Although Menkauhor is well attested by historical sources, few artefacts from his reign have survived. Consequently, his familial relation to his predecessor and successor is unclear, and no offspring of his have been identified. Khentkaus III may have been Menkauhor's mother, as indicated by evidence discovered in her tomb in 2015.

Beyond the construction of monuments, the only known activity dated to Menkauhor's reign is an expedition to the copper and turquoise mines in Sinai. Menkauhor ordered the construction of a sun temple, called the "Akhet-Ra", meaning "The Horizon of Ra".  The last to be built, this sun temple, known from inscriptions found in the tombs of its priests, is yet to be located. Menkauhor was buried in a small pyramid in Saqqara, which the Ancient Egyptians named Netjer-Isut Menkauhor, "The Divine Places of Menkauhor". Known today as the Headless Pyramid, the ruin had been lost under shifting sands until its rediscovery in 2008.

The figure of Menkauhor was at the centre of a long lasting funerary cult until the end of the Old Kingdom period, with at least seven agricultural domains producing goods for the necessary offerings. The cult of a deified Menkauhor, then known by the titles "Strong Lord of the Two Lands, Menkauhor the Justified" reappeared during the New Kingdom period (c. 1550 – c. 1077 BC), and lasted until at least the Nineteenth Dynasty (c. 1292 – c. 1077 BC), some 1200 years after his death.

Attestations

Historical
Menkauhor is attested by three hieroglyphic sources, all from the much later New Kingdom period. His name is given on the 31st entry of the Abydos King List, which was inscribed on the walls of a temple during the reign of Seti I (1290–1279 BC). He is also mentioned on the Saqqara Tablet (30th entry) and on the Turin canon (third column, 23rd row), both of which were written during the reign of Ramesses II (1279–1213 BC). The Turin canon credits Menkauhor with a reign of eight years. These sources indicate that Menkauhor succeeded Nyuserre Ini and preceded Djedkare Isesi on the throne, making him the seventh pharaoh of the Fifth Dynasty.

Menkauhor was likely mentioned in the Aegyptiaca, a history of Egypt written in the 3rd century BC during the reign of Ptolemy II (283–246 BC) by the Egyptian priest Manetho, but no copies of the text survive, and it is known only through later writings by Sextus Julius Africanus and Eusebius. Africanus relates that the Aegyptiaca mentioned a pharaoh "Mencherês" reigning for nine years as the seventh king of the Fifth Dynasty. Mencherês is believed to be a Hellenized form of Menkauhor, and Africanus' nine-year figure fits well with the eight years of reign given to Menkauhor on the Turin canon, the latter figure being considered by some Egyptologists, including Hartwig Altenmüller, as more likely than the former.

Contemporaneous

Relatively few attestations dating to Menkauhor's reign have survived compared to the other kings of the Fifth Dynasty. Nonetheless, Menkauhor's name is well attested in the names and titles of priests and officials of the Fifth Dynasty as well as in the names of the agricultural estates associated with his funerary cult. Surviving artefacts contemporaneous with Menkauhor's reign include two stone vessels inscribed with his name from the mortuary temple of Neferefre – possibly gifts from Menkauhor for the funerary cult of Neferefre– as well as a few sealings from the same temple and from an area known as "Djedkare's Family Cemetery" in Abusir. Cylinder seal impressions showing Menkauhor's Horus name or the name of his pyramid have also been unearthed in the mortuary complex of Nyuserre Ini, and in the necropolises of Giza and Gebelein.

A gold cylinder seal bearing Menkauhor's cartouche as part of the name of his pyramid together with the serekh of Djedkare Isesi is now on display at the Museum of Fine Arts, Boston. The seal, purportedly discovered near the Pactolus river valley in western Anatolia, could attest to wide-ranging trade-contacts during the Fifth Dynasty, but its provenance remains unverifiable.

The only secure depiction of the king dating to the Old Kingdom that has survived to this day is a rough, possibly unfinished, alabaster statuette showing Menkauhor enthroned and wearing the tight-fitting ceremonial robe of the Heb-sed. The statue was discovered in a cachette built during the late New Kingdom beneath the floor of a room to the west of the sacred lake at the temple of Ptah in Memphis. The Egyptologist Jocelyn Berlandini proposed that another statuette, usually attributed to Teti, belongs instead to Menkauhor Kaiu. Berlandini bases her hypothesis on stylistic grounds, noting the resemblance with Menkauhor's seated statue, as well as the location of the second statue, which was uncovered east of Teti's pyramid, in close proximity to Menkauhor's pyramid.

Monumental attestations of Menkauhor are limited to a rock inscription at the Wadi Maghareh in Sinai, showing his titulary and a rough stele inscribed with his cartouche from Mastaba 904 at Saqqara.

Family

Name
The name of Menkauhor is a departure from those of other kings of the Fifth Dynasty. Menkauhor, whose name means "Eternal are the Kas of Horus", is the first pharaoh in 80 years whose name does not refer to the sun god Ra. The name of Menkauhor instead finds its peers among the princes of the Fifth Dynasty with, for example, prince Khentykauhor "The forces of Horus are at the fore", a son of Nyuserre Ini, and prince Neserkauhor, a son of Djedkare Isesi.

Filiation
Owing to the paucity of contemporaneous sources for Menkauhor, his relation to his predecessor, Nyuserre Ini, and to his successor, Djedkare Isesi, cannot be ascertained beyond doubt. Menkauhor may have been a son of Nyuserre Ini; indeed Nyuserre Ini is known to have fathered a prince Khentykauhor as shown by a relief mentioning the prince from the mortuary complex of queen Khentkaus II, the mother of Nyuserre Ini. The similarity of Khentykauhor's name to that of Menkauhor led the Egyptologists Miroslav Verner and Vivienne Callender to propose that the two are the same person, with Khentykauhor taking the name "Menkauhor" upon ascending the throne. This hypothesis is possibly contradicted by an inscription discovered in 2008 in the mastaba of Werkaure, the eldest son of an unnamed king. The inscription mentions a "Menkauhor", but does not ascribe any royal attributes to him. The Egyptologists Hana Vymazalová and Filip Coppens suggest this might refer to the future pharaoh Menkauhor Kaiu at a time when he was still a prince. They note that Menkauhor might have offered high-quality stone blocks for the construction of the tomb of his (possible) relative, which would explain the inscription. This contradicts the identification of Menkauhor with Khentykauhor; Vymazalová and Coppens theorize that Khentykauhor and Menkauhor were brothers and sons of Nyuserre Ini.

The identity of Menkauhor's mother is equally uncertain. In January 2015 the tomb of the "King's wife" and "King's mother", Khentkaus III, was discovered by a team of Czech archaeologists in the necropolis surrounding the pyramid of Neferefre in Abusir. Mud seals in the tomb indicate that Khentkaus III was buried during Nyuserre Ini's reign. Since Nyuserre Ini's own mother is known to have been Khentkaus II, the discovery suggests that she was Menkauhor Kaiu's mother. The position of her tomb close to the pyramid of Neferefre could indicate that she was this king's consort and thus that Neferefre was Menkauhor's father.

Consorts
No queen consort of Menkauhor has been identified for certain. The Egyptologist Wilfried Seipel has proposed that Khuit I was a queen of Menkauhor. Based on the dating of the tombs surrounding Khuit's burial, Seipel argues that she lived during the mid-Fifth Dynasty. By the process of elimination, he attributes known queens to each king of the period, which leaves only Menkauhor as a candidate for her king. These arguments are criticized by the Egyptologist Michel Baud, who observes that pharaohs could have had more than one queen.

Queen Meresankh IV has also been suggested as a consort for Menkauhor based on the dating and location of her tomb in Saqqara. It is possible however that she was a wife of Djedkare Isesi.

Descendants
There is no evidence either for or against the hypothesis that Menkauhor's successor Djedkare Isesi was his son. Two sons have been suggested for Menkauhor based on the dating and general location of their tombs in Saqqara: princes Raemka and Kaemtjenent, both believed to be children of Meresankh IV. By the same reasoning, they could instead be sons of Djedkare Isesi.

Reign

Duration

Given the scarcity of contemporaneous attestations for Menkauhor, modern Egyptologists consider his reign to have been perhaps eight or nine years long, as indicated by the much later historical sources.
The small seated statue of Menkauhor wearing the robe of the Sed festival might suggest a longer reign, since this festival was typically celebrated only after a ruler had spent 30 years on the throne. However, Egyptologist Hartwig Altenmüller deems this hypothesis unlikely.
Mere depictions of the festival do not necessarily imply a long reign; for example, a relief showing pharaoh Sahure in the tunic of the Sed festival was found in his mortuary temple, although both historical sources and archaeological evidence suggest Sahure ruled Egypt for less than 14 full years.

Activities
Owing to the scarcity of artefacts and inscriptions relating to Menkauhor's reign, few of his activities are known. Menkauhor sent an expedition to Sinai to exploit the mines of turquoise and copper in the Wadi Maghareh. The expedition is evidenced by a damaged rock inscription showing Menkauhor's titulary which is one of the few attestations dating to his lifetime. The mines of Sinai had been exploited since the Third Dynasty (2686 BC–2613 BC), and both Menkauhor's predecessor Nyuserre Ini and successor Djedkare Isesi sent expeditions to the Wadi Maghareh.

Construction activities
Menkauhor Kaiu is known to have ordered the construction of two major monuments during his reign: a sun temple for the veneration of Ra and a pyramid for his burial, known today as the "Headless Pyramid".

Sun temple

Following a tradition which started with Userkaf, the founder of the Fifth Dynasty, Menkauhor built a temple to the sun god Ra. He was the last pharaoh to do so. His successors, Djedkare Isesi and Unas, abandoned this practice as the cult of Ra declined at the expense of that of Osiris. Given the paucity of documents relating to Menkauhor's sun temple, it probably functioned for only a short time or was never completed.

Menkauhor's sun temple was called Akhet-Ra, which is variously translated as "The Horizon of Ra" or "The Place where Ra Issues Forth". The temple has yet to be located and could be lying under the sands of Saqqara or Abusir. Its existence is known thanks to inscriptions found in the tombs of Fifth and Sixth Dynasties officials who served as priests of Ra in the temple. These include Hemu, buried in Giza, and Neferiretptah and Raemankh, who were both buried in Saqqara-north. In addition to his service in the Akhet-Ra, Neferiretptah was a priest in Menkauhor's pyramid and held the office of "royal ornament", making him responsible for the precious items in the palace of the king.

Besides these inscriptions, a single seal bearing the name of the Akhet-Ra is known from the tomb of princess Khamerernebti, located near the mortuary temple of Niuserre in Abusir. The seal was placed on a large vessel indicating that provisions for the tombs of members of the royal family were dispatched from Menkauhor's temple to Niuserre's pyramid complex.

Pyramid

Menkauhor Kaiu built a pyramid in North-Saqqara, thereby abandoning the royal necropolis of Abusir, where kings of the Fifth Dynasty had been buried since the reign of Sahure, some 80 years earlier. The reason for this choice may be that the Abusir plateau had become overcrowded by the beginning of Menkauhor's reign.

Originally named Netjer-isut-Menkauhor by the Ancient Egyptians, meaning "The divine places of Menkauhor", the pyramid is known today as Lepsius XXIX after the number given to it by the archaeologist Karl Richard Lepsius who discovered the pyramid in 1843. Owing to the ruined state of the structure, it is known in Arabic as the "Headless Pyramid", a name that has been retained. The pyramid was lost under shifting sands in the early 20th century and its attribution to Menkauhor was consequently debated. Instead, it was proposed that the Headless Pyramid was that of Merikare, a structure dating to the First Intermediate Period and which has yet to be found. In 2008, the structure identified by Lepsius was rediscovered by a team of archaeologists under the direction of Zahi Hawass, and excavations at the site quickly established a Fifth Dynasty date as indicated by the construction techniques used in its making. Although the excavations failed to yield the name of the king who built the pyramid, Menkauhor was the last pharaoh of the dynasty whose pyramid remained undiscovered. Thus, proceeding by elimination, archeologists and egyptologists have formally recognized the Headless Pyramid as that of Menkauhor.

There is evidence that Menkauhor had the time to complete his pyramid, whose small dimensions are thus consistent with his short eight to nine years of reign.

On the north side lies the entrance to the underground chamber system, which was sealed by two granite portcullises indicating that a burial took place. A broken sarcophagus lid of blue-grey basalt was found in the burial chamber by Cecil Mallaby Firth during his brief excavations of the pyramid in 1930.

Funerary cult

Old Kingdom
After his death Menkauhor enjoyed a funerary cult centered on his pyramid complex. The cult lasted at least until the second half of the Sixth Dynasty, nearly 150 years later. Provisions for this cult were produced in dedicated agricultural domains that were established during Menkauhor's lifetime. Products of these domains were delivered to Menkauhor's sun and mortuary temples and distributed to the priests of the cult, who could use them for their sustenance or their own funerary cults. Personified representations of Menkauhor's agricultural domains are depicted bringing offerings on the walls of the mastabas of these priests. Most of the depictions are located in Saqqara North, near the pyramid complex of Djoser. This area comprises the tombs of Neferiretptah, Raemankh, Duare, Iti, Sekhemnefer, Snofrunefer, Akhethotep, Ptahhotep and Qednes, all priests of the funerary cult of Menkauhor. Further tombs of priests of this cult are found to the north, in Abusir South, with the mastaba of Isesiseneb and Rahotep and in Giza.

The complete names of at least seven domains of Menkauhor are known: "Ikauhor is perfect in favor" and "the favor of Ikauhor", both mentioned in the tombs of Ptahhotep and Akhethotep; "Ikauhor is perfect of life", from the tomb of Ptahhotep II; "Horus Qemaa causes Ikauhor to live"; "Ikauhor is strong"; "Seshat loves Ikauhor" and "Matyt loves Ikauhor" from the tombs of viziers Senedjemib Inti, Senedjemib Mehi and Hemu in Giza. In addition the Ḥwt domain of the king, which comprises the land holdings of the mortuary temple of Menkauhor, was named "Menkauhor is perfect of appearances".

New Kingdom

The cult of Menkauhor enjoyed a revival during the New Kingdom period (1550–1077 BC). At this point Menkauhor had been deified as a local god of the Saqqara necropolis acting as a divine intercessor, and qualified of "Strong Lord of the Two Lands, Menkauhor the Justified". This cult is evidenced by reliefs showing Menkauhor in the tombs of the "Chief of the artisans and jewelers" Ameneminet and of the physician Thuthu in Saqqara-North, both of whom lived at the time of the late Eighteenth Dynasty (1550–1292 BC), during the reigns of Tutankhamun, Ay and Horemheb.

An inscribed block dating to the later Ramesside period (1292–1077 BC) and now in the Egyptian Museum of Berlin, was uncovered by Lepsius in a house in Abusir and shows Menkauhor enthroned beside four other deified kings of the Old Kingdom: the name of the first, partially lost, but probably Sneferu is then followed by Djedefre, Menkaure, Menkauhor and finally Neferkare. The owner of the tomb stands before the kings, in worship. Another relief dating to the same period shows a similar scene. It was inscribed on the lintel of the tomb chapel of Mahy buried in Saqqara North. Four deified kings of the Old Kingdom are shown, all of whom built their pyramids at Saqqara: Djoser, Teti, Userkaf and Menkauhor.

The persistence of the cult of Menkauhor during the late Eighteenth to Nineteenth Dynasty possibly results from the location of his pyramid, which stood on the way to the necropolis of the Apis bulls, which later became the Serapeum.

See also
 List of pharaohs

Notes

References

Bibliography

External links

25th-century BC Pharaohs
24th-century BC Pharaohs
Pharaohs of the Fifth Dynasty of Egypt